Er. Ajit Kumar is an Indian politician. He was elected to the Bihar Legislative Assembly from Kanti in the February 2005, October 2005 and 2010 Bihar Legislative Assembly election as a member of the Janata Dal (United). He joined Hindustani Awam Morcha when former Chief Minister of Bihar, Jitan Ram Manjhi, who left the Janata Dal (United) along with 18 others to form the party following the 2015 Bihar political crisis. He lost Kanti seat in 2015 Bihar Legislative Assembly election.

References

Year of birth missing (living people)
Living people
Members of the Bihar Legislative Assembly
People from Muzaffarpur district
Hindustani Awam Morcha politicians
Janata Dal (United) politicians
Lok Janshakti Party politicians